Butrointsi is a village in Tran Municipality, Pernik Province in western Bulgaria. It is about 10 km east from the town of Tran. 

The village is located at 900 m above sea level. Its population is 28 persons.

Honours
Butrointsi Point in Antarctica is named after the village.

Villages in Pernik Province